The 2010 European Team Championships Super League was the Super League of the 2nd edition of the European Team Championships (European Athletics Team Championships from 2013 edition), the 2010 European Team Championships, which took place on 19 and 20 June 2010 in Bergen, Norway. As with the previous championships there were a couple of rules applying specifically to this competition, such as the limit of three attempts in the throwing events, long jump and triple jump (only the top four were allowed the fourth attempt) and the limit of four misses total in the high jump and pole vault.

Final standings

Men

100 metres 
Wind:Heat A: +1.1 m/sHeat B: +2.1 m/s

200 metres 
Wind:Heat A: +0.4 m/sHeat B: +1.0 m/s

400 metres

800 metres

1500 metres

3000 metres

5000 metres

3000 metres steeplechase

110 metres hurdles 
Wind:Heat A: -0.1 m/sHeat B: -0.5 m/s

400 metres hurdles

4 × 100 metres relay

4 × 400 metres relay

High jump

Pole vault

Long jump

Triple jump

Shot put

Discus throw

Hammer throw

Javelin throw

Women

100 metres 
Wind:Heat A: +2.4 m/sHeat B: +1.3 m/s

200 metres 
Wind:Heat A: +1.8 m/sHeat B: +0.7 m/s

400 metres

800 metres

1500 metres

3000 metres

5000 metres

3000 metres steeplechase

100 metres hurdles 
Wind:Heat A: -0.3 m/sHeat B: +0.9 m/s

400 metres hurdles

4 × 100 metres relay

4 × 400 metres relay

High jump

Pole vault

Long jump

Triple jump

Shot put

Discus throw

Hammer throw

Javelin throw

Score table

References 
 Complete Results from the 2010 European Team Championships Super League

European Athletics Team Championships Super League
European
2010 in Norwegian sport
Sports competitions in Bergen
International athletics competitions hosted by Norway
June 2010 sports events in Europe
21st century in Bergen